The 1978 Atlanta Falcons season was the Falcons' 13th season. After losing four of their first six games, Atlanta rebounded to win seven of their last ten, and their 9-7 record was the third best in a weak NFC. The NFC West runners-up thus not only secured their first-ever postseason berth in franchise history, but earned a home playoff game under the expanded ten team format.

Hosting the Philadelphia Eagles in their first ever playoff game, the Falcons scored two touchdowns in their final fourteen minutes to pull out a 14–13 win. In the divisional round, the Falcons were 14-point underdogs facing the Dallas Cowboys. Atlanta took a 20-13 lead into halftime, but the Cowboys came back to take a 27-20 lead. In their final drive, the Falcons fell inches short of a first down on the Cowboys' 32-yard line, as Dallas got the ball and ran down the clock.

NFL Draft

Personnel

Staff

Roster

Regular season

Schedule

Note: Intra-division opponents are in bold text.

Standings

Game summaries

Week 1

Week 2

Week 3

Week 4

Week 5

Week 6

Week 7 vs. Detroit Lions
Network: CBS
Announcers: Vin Scully, George Allen and Jim Brown
Steve Bartkowski threw a 24-yard touchdown pass to Billy Ryckman early in the second quarter and Bubba Bean erupted for a 25-yard touchdown run in the final minutes of the game as the Falcons got a critical win to stay alive in the NFC Playoff hunt. The Falcons defense also played a part in their win with two brilliant goal line stands. It was the first home shutout in Falcons History. The Lions' woeful offense could produce only 22 rushing yards.

Week 8 vs San Francisco 49ers
Atlanta erased a 17-7 deficit in the final 5:38 of the game, beating San Francisco on Tim Mazzetti's last-second, 29-yard field goal. Steve Bartkowski directed the comeback, hitting a 71-yard bomb to set up a 21-yard Mazzetti field goal, completing a 59-yard scoring pass to Billy Ryckman with 1:52 remaining and then finding Tim Mitchell with a 19-yard reception to set up a winning kick. This game was broadcast by CBS with announcers Vin Scully, George Allen and Jim Brown at the game.

Week 9

Week 10 vs. San Francisco 49ers
TV Network: CBS
Announcers: Frank Glieber and Johnny Unitas
Steve Bartkowski, who suffered a separate shoulder last Monday, ran for one touchdown and threw a 37-yard scoring pass to Wallace Francis as Atlanta spoiled the head coaching debutof the 49ers' Fred O'Connor who replaced the fired Pete McCulley on Tuesday. San Francisco's O.J. Simpson suffered a shoulder separation early in the second period. Simpson had carried 5 times for only 15 yards before the injury. Atlanta's win help keep their playoff hopes alive for a wild card berth at 6-4 the same record as the Cowboys and the Vikings.

Week 11

Week 12

Week 13

Week 14

Week 15

Week 16

Postseason

NFC Wild Card Game

The Falcons won their first playoff game in team history after they overcame a 13–0 deficit by scoring 2 touchdowns in the final 5 minutes of the game.

NFC Divisional Playoff

Dallas' "Doomsday Defense" limited Atlanta quarterback Steve Bartkowski to only 8 completions in 23 attempts and intercepted him 3 times en route to victory. After the Falcons led 20–13 at halftime, the Cowboys scored 14 unanswered points in the second half.

References

External links
 1978 Atlanta Falcons at Pro-Football-Reference.com

Atlanta Falcons
Atlanta Falcons seasons
Atlanta